Chaulia Patty is a mahalla (also called village) by the Punarbhaba River in Dinajpur District, Bangladesh.

References

Populated places in Rangpur Division